WK1 may refer to:
Scaled Composites White Knight, also known as WhiteKnightOne (WK1)
Wrestle Kingdom 1 at January_4_Dome_Show#Wrestle_Kingdom_in_Tokyo_Dome
.wk1 file extension of Lotus 1-2-3